Firefall is the self-titled debut from Firefall which saw its release in April 1976.

It featured the major hit single "You Are the Woman" which reached #9 on the Billboard Hot 100. Two other tracks achieved minor success on the charts: "Livin' Ain't Livin'" at #42 and "Cinderella" at #34. This album became the fastest record to achieve gold status in Atlantic Records history.

Track listing 
 "It Doesn't Matter" – 3:31 (Chris Hillman, Rick Roberts, Stephen Stills)
 "Love Isn't All" – 4:13 (Larry Burnett)
 "Livin' Ain't Livin'" – 3:49 (Rick Roberts)
 "No Way Out" – 4:05 (Larry Burnett)
 "Dolphin's Lullaby" – 4:34 (Rick Roberts)
 "Cinderella" – 3:53 (Larry Burnett)
 "Sad Ol' Love Song" – 4:42 (Larry Burnett)
 "You Are the Woman" – 2:45  (Rick Roberts)
 "Mexico" – 4:17 (Rick Roberts)
 "Do What You Want" – 4:00 (Larry Burnett)

Charts

Certifications

Personnel
Firefall
 Mark Andes - bass guitar
 Jock Bartley - lead electric & slide guitars; Bigsby Palm Pedal guitar on "Livin' Ain't Livin"
 Larry Burnett - electric and acoustic rhythm guitars, vocals
 Michael Clarke - drums
 Rick Roberts - acoustic guitars, vocals

with
 David Muse - piano, clavinet, synthesizer, flute, tenor saxophone & harmonica
 Joe Lala - congas, timbales, shakers, tambourine, finger cymbals, & sand blocks on "Love Isn't All"
 Peter Graves - trombone on "Do What You Want"
 Ken Faulk - trumpet on "Do What You Want" and "Mexico"
 Whit Sidener - baritone saxophone on "Do What You Want"

Production
Produced by Jim Mason of FREEFLOW PRODUCTIONS
Mastered by George Marino at Sterling Sound, NYC
Engineered by Karl Richardson, assisted by Michael Laskow
Front album cover art by Ralph Wernli
Cover Concept by Jock Bartley

References 

1976 debut albums
Firefall albums
Atlantic Records albums